Grainville-la-Teinturière is a commune in the Seine-Maritime department in the Normandy region in northern France.

Geography

Population

Places of interest
 The church of Notre-Dame, dating from the sixteenth century.
 Vestiges of an 11th-century castle: motte; donjon; moat
A museum dedicated to Jean de Béthencourt, explorer, who died at the castle.

Twin towns
 Teguise, Lanzarote, in the Canary Islands.
 Betancuria, Fuerteventura, in the Canary Islands.

See also
Communes of the Seine-Maritime department

References

Communes of Seine-Maritime